There are a total of 77 retiring and term-limited congressmen after the 14th Congress. Congressmen who had served three consecutive terms are prohibited from running in the elections; they may run again in 2013 for the 16th Congress.

Retiring and term-limited incumbents

Lakas-Kampi-CMD incumbents (45)
Agusan del Norte's 2nd legislative district: Edelmiro Amante: Retiring to make way for his daughter to run.
Antipolo's 2nd legislative district: Angelito Gatlabayan: Ran and lost in the Mayoralty race in Antipolo as the NPC candidate to incumbent Danilo Leyble (Lakas-Kampi-CMD).
Antique's legislative district: Exequiel Javier: Term-limited in 2010, ran and won as Governor of  Antique. 
Bacolod's legislative district: Monico Puentevella: Term-limited in 2010, ran and lost in the Mayoralty race in Bacolod to incumbent Evelio Leonardia (NPC) .
Baguio's legislative district: Mauricio Domogan: Term-limited in 2010, ran and won as Mayor of Baguio.
Batangas's 1st legislative district: Eileen Ermita-Buhain: Term-limited in 2010.
Batangas's 3rd legislative district: Victoria Hernandez-Reyes: Term-limited in 2010, ran and lost in the Mayoralty race in Tanauan to incumbent Sonia Torres-Aquino (Liberal).  
Benguet's legislative district: Samuel Dangwa: Term-limited in 2010, ran and lost in the Gubernatorial race in Benguet as an independent candidate to incumbent Nestor Fongwan (Lakas-Kampi-CMD).
Bohol's 1st legislative district: Edgar Chatto: Term-limited in 2010, ran and won as Governor of Bohol.
Bohol's 2nd legislative district: Roberto Cajes: Term-limited in 2010, ran and won as Mayor of Trinidad, Bohol.
Bohol's 3rd legislative district: Adam Relson Jala: Not running.
Bulacan's 3rd legislative district: Lorna Silverio: Term-limited in 2010, ran and won as Mayor of San Rafael, Bulacan.
Bulacan's 4th legislative district: Reylina Nicolas: Term-limited in 2010.
Camarines Sur's 4th legislative district: Felix Alfelor, Jr.: Term-limited in 2010, ran and lost in the Gubernatorial race in Camarines Sur to incumbent Luis Raymond Villafuerte (Nacionalista).
Capiz's 2nd legislative district: Fredenil Castro: Term-limited in 2010.
Cebu City's 1st legislative district: Raul del Mar: Term-limited in 2010.
Cebu City's 2nd legislative district: Antonio Cuenco: Term-limited in 2010, appointed as Secretary-General of the ASEAN Inter-Parliamentary Assembly (AIPA) on February 4, 2010.
Compostela Valley's 1st legislative district: Manuel Zamora: Term-limited in 2010.
Davao City's 1st legislative district: Prospero Nograles: Term-limited in 2010, ran and lost in the Mayoralty race in Davao City to Vice Mayor Sara Zimmerman Duterte (Hugpong sa Tawong Lungsod-PDP–Laban-Liberal).
Davao del Norte's 1st legislative district: Arrel Olaño: Run and Lost in Mayoralty race in Tagum City To Incumbent Rey Uy (Liberal Party (Philippines)).
Dinagat Islands's legislative district: Glenda Ecleo: Term-limited in 2010.
Ifugao's legislative district: Solomon Chungalao: Term-limited in 2010, ran and lost in the Gubernatorial race in Ifugao to Eugene Balitang (Liberal).
Ilocos Norte's 1st legislative district: Roque Ablan, Jr.: Term-limited in 2010.
Ilocos Sur's 2nd legislative district: Eric Singson: Term-limited in 2010.
Iloilo's 3rd legislative district: Arthur Defensor, Sr.: Term-limited in 2010, ran and won as Governor of Iloilo.
Lanao del Norte's 1st legislative district: Abdullah D. Dimaporo: Term-limited in 2010, retiring from politics.
Lanao del Sur's 1st legislative district: Faysah R.P.M. Dumarpa: Term-limited in 2010.
Leyte's 2nd legislative district: Trinidad Apostol: Term-limited in 2010, ran and won as Mayor of Carigara, Leyte.
Leyte's 4th legislative district: Eufrocino Codilla, Sr.: Term-limited in 2010.
Leyte's 5th legislative district: Carmen L. Cari: Term-limited in 2010, ran and won as Mayor of Baybay unopposed.
Manila's 2nd legislative district: Jaime C. Lopez: Term-limited in 2010.
Misamis Occidental's 2nd legislative district: Herminia D. Ramiro: Term-limited in 2010, ran and won as Governor of Misamis Occidental.
Negros Occidental's legislative district: Jose Carlos Lacson: Term-limited in 2010, ran and lost in the Mayoralty race in Talisay to Eric Saratan (Liberal Party).
North Cotabato's 1st legislative district: Emmylou Taliño-Mendoza: Term-limited in 2010, ran and won as Governor of North Cotabato.
Quirino's legislative district: Junie Cua: Term-limited in 2010, ran and won as Governor of Quirino.
Pampanga's 3rd legislative district: Mikey Arroyo: Not running to make way for his mother Gloria Macapagal Arroyo to run, running as the first party nominee of the party-list group Ang Galing Pinoy.
Samar's 1st legislative district: Reynaldo S. Uy: Term-limited in 2010, ran and won as Mayor of Calbayog. 
Samar's 2nd legislative district: Sharee Ann T. Tan: Ran and won as Governor of Samar.  
Sarangani's legislative district: Erwin Chiongbian: Term-limited in 2010.
Sorsogon's 2nd legislative district: Jose G. Solis: Term-limited in 2010, ran and lost in the Gubernatorial race in Sorsogon as Kampi's candidate to Raul Lee (Lakas-Kampi-CMD).
South Cotabato's 2nd legislative district: Arthur Pingoy, Jr.: Term-limited in 2010, ran and won as Governor of South Cotabato.
Tarlac's 1st legislative district: Monica Prieto-Teodoro: To help her husband Gilberto Teodoro campaign for President.
Zamboanga del Norte's 1st legislative district: Cecilia Jalosjos-Carreon: Term-limited in 2010.
Zamboanga Sibugay's 1st legislative district: Belma Cabilao: Term-limited in 2010.
Zamboanga Sibugay's 2nd legislative district: Dulce Ann Hofer: Ran and lost in the Gubernatorial race in Zamboanga Sibugay to Rommel Jalosjos (Nacionalista).

Liberal Party incumbents (11)
Bukidnon's 2nd legislative district: Teofisto Guingona III: Ran and won in the Senatorial race (12th place, first 12 are elected).
Cagayan's 3rd legislative district: Manuel Mamba: Term-limited in 2010, ran and lost in the Gubernatorial race in Cagayan to incumbent Alvaro Antonio (Lakas-Kampi-CMD).
Isabela's 2nd legislative district: Edwin Uy: Term-limited in 2010, ran and lost in the Vice Gubernatorial race Isabela to Rep. Rodolfo Albano III (Lakas-Kampi-CMD).
Marinduque's legislative district: Carmencita Reyes: ran and won as Governor of Marinduque, also as Bigkis Pinoy's candidate.
Marikina's 2nd legislative district: Del R. De Guzman: Term-limited in 2010, ran and won as Mayor of Marikina.
Muntinlupa's legislative district: Ruffy Biazon: Term-limited in 2010, ran and lost in the Senatorial race (14th place, first 12 are elected)
Oriental Mindoro's 2nd legislative district: Alfonso Umali, Jr.: Term-limited in 2010, ran and won as Governor of Oriental Mindoro.
Quezon's 2nd legislative district: Proceso Alcala: Not running, appointed as Agriculture secretary.
Quezon City's 4th legislative district: Nanette Castelo-Daza: Term-limited in 2010.
Palawan's 2nd legislative district: Abraham Kahlil Mitra: Term-limited in 2010, ran and won as Governor of Palawan.
Pangasinan's 2nd legislative district: Victor Agbayani: Ran and lost in the Gubernatorial race in Pangasinan to incumbent Amado Espino, Jr. (Lakas-Kampi-CMD).

Nacionalista incumbents (7)
Cagayan de Oro's 1st congressional district: Rolando Uy: Ran and lost for Mayor of Cagayan de Oro to Vicente Emano (PMP) as Lakas Kampi's candidate .
Cebu's 6th legislative district: Nerissa Corazon Soon-Ruiz: Term-limited in 2010, ran and lost for mayor of Mandaue City to Jonas Cortes (independent)
Ilocos Norte's 2nd legislative district: Bongbong Marcos: Ran and won for the Senate (6th, first 12 are elected).
Las Piñas's legislative district: Cynthia Villar: Term-limited in 2010.
Parañaque City's 1st legislative district: Eduardo Zialcita: Term-limited in 2010, ran and lost for Mayor of Parañaque to Florencio Bernabe (Lakas Kampi)
Taguig-Pateros's 1st legislative district: Laarni Cayetano: Ran and won for mayor of Taguig.
San Juan City's legislative district: Ronaldo Zamora: Term-limited in 2010.

Nationalist People's Coalition incumbents (12)
Agusan del Sur's legislative district: Rodolfo Plaza: Term-limited in 2010, to ran and lost in the Senatorial race. 
Cagayan's 1st legislative district: Sally Ponce Enrile: Retiring to make way for her husband to run.
Catanduanes's legislative district: Joseph Santiago: Term-limited in 2010, ran and lost in the Gubernatorial race in Catanduanes to incumbent Joseph Cua (Nacionalista).
Davao City's 2nd legislative district: Vincent Garcia: Term-limited in 2010.
Isabela's 3rd legislative district: Faustino Dy III: Term-limited in 2010, ran and won in the Gubernatorial race in Isabela as Lakas-Kampi-CMD's official candidate.
Masbate's 3rd legislative district: Rizalina Seachon-Lanete: ran and won in the Gubernatorial race in Masbate.
Pangasinan's 5th legislative district: Marcos Cojuangco: Term-limited in 2010.
Pangasinan's 6th legislative district: Conrado M. Estrella III: Term-limited in 2010.
Quezon City's 2nd legislative district: Mary Ann Susano: Ran and lost in the Mayoralty race in Quezon City to Vice Mayor Herbert Bautista (Liberal).
Rizal's 1st legislative district: Michael John Duavit: Term-limited in 2010.
South Cotabato's 1st legislative district: Darlene Antonino-Custodio: Term-limited in 2010, ran and won in the Mayoral race in General Santos.
Sulu's 2nd legislative district: Munir Arbison: Term-limited in 2010, ran and lost in the Gubernatorial race in Sulu to incumbent Abdusakur Tan (Lakas-Kampi-CMD).

Partido Demokratiko Pilipino-Lakas ng Bayan incumbent (1)
Makati City's 1st legislative district: Teodoro Locsin, Jr.: Term-limited in 2010.

Independent incumbents (2)
Nueva Ecija's 1st legislative district: Eduardo Nonato N. Joson: "To help bring their local party to victory in 2010".
Pangasinan's 4th legislative district: Jose de Venecia, Jr.: Term-limited in 2010.

Party-list incumbents (10)
Akbayan: Risa Hontiveros-Baraquel:  Second-termer, ran as the Liberal candidate and lost in the Senatorial race (13th place, first 12 are elected).
Anak Mindanao: Mujiv Hataman: Term-limited in 2010, ran as the Liberal candidate and lost in the Gubernatorial race in Basilan to incumbent Jum J. Akbar (Lakas-Kampi-CMD).
Association of Philippine Electric Cooperatives: Ernesto C. Pablo: Term-limited in 2010.
Association of Philippine Electric Cooperatives: Edgar L. Valdez: Term-limited in 2010.
Bayan Muna: Satur Ocampo: Term-limited in 2010, ran and lost in the Senatorial race.
Buhay Hayaan Yumabong: Rene Velarde: Term-limited in 2010.
Citizen's Battle Against Corruption: Joel Villanueva: Term-limited in 2010. 
GABRIELA: Liza Maza: Term-limited in 2010, ran as an independent candidate and lost in the Senatorial race. 
Kasangga sa Kaunlaran: Ma. Lourdes Arroyo: Retiring from politics.
The True Marcos Loyalist (For God, Country and People) Association of the Philippines (BANTAY): Jovito Palparan:  First-termer, ran as an independent candidate and lost in the Senatorial race.

References

2010 Philippine general election